Tonde Wandou (also Tonde Wadou) is a village in the commune of Galim-Tignère in the Adamawa Region of Cameroon, near the .

Population 
In 1971, Tonde Wandou contained 290 inhabitants, mainly Wodaabe.

At the time of the 2005 census, there were 619 people in the village.

References

Bibliography 
 Jean Boutrais (ed.), Peuples et cultures de l'Adamaoua (Cameroun) : Actes du colloque de Ngaoundéré, du 14 au 16 janvier 1992, ORSTOM, Paris ; Ngaoundéré-Anthropos, 1993, 316 p. 
 Dictionnaire des villages de l'Adamaoua, ONAREST, Yaoundé, October 1974, 133 p.

External links 
 Galim-Tignère, on the website Communes et villes unies du Cameroun (CVUC)

Populated places in Adamawa Region